Apristurus is a genus of catsharks, the family Scyliorhinidae, commonly known as the ghost or demon catsharks.

Species
The 39 currently recognized species in this genus are:
 Apristurus albisoma Nakaya & Séret, 1999 (white-bodied catshark)
 Apristurus ampliceps Sasahara, Sato & Nakaya, 2008 (roughskin catshark)
 Apristurus aphyodes Nakaya & Stehmann, 1998 (white ghost catshark)
 Apristurus australis Sato Nakaya & Yorozu, 2008 (Pinocchio catshark)
 Apristurus breviventralis Kawauchi, Weigmann & Nakaya, 2014 (shortbelly catshark) 
 Apristurus brunneus C. H. Gilbert, 1892 (brown catshark)
 Apristurus bucephalus W. T. White, Last & Pogonoski, 2008 (bighead catshark)
 Apristurus canutus S. Springer & Heemstra, 1979 (hoary catshark)
 Apristurus exsanguis Sato, Nakaya & A. L. Stewart, 1999 (flaccid catshark)
 Apristurus fedorovi Dolganov, 1985 (Fedorov's catshark)
 Apristurus garricki Sato, Stewart & Nakaya, 2013 (Garrick's catshark)  
 Apristurus gibbosus Y. T. Chu, Q. W. Meng & S. Li, 1985 (humpback catshark)
 Apristurus herklotsi Fowler, 1934 (longfin catshark)
 Apristurus indicus A. B. Brauer, 1906 (smallbelly catshark)
 Apristurus internatus S. M. Deng, G. Q. Xiong & H. X. Zhan, 1988  (shortnose demon catshark)
 Apristurus investigatoris Misra, 1962 (broadnose catshark)
 Apristurus japonicus Nakaya, 1975 (Japanese catshark)
 Apristurus kampae L. R. Taylor, 1972 (longnose catshark)
 Apristurus laurussonii Sæmundsson, 1922 (Iceland catshark)
 Apristurus longicephalus Nakaya, 1975 (longhead catshark)
 Apristurus macrorhynchus S. Tanaka (I), 1909 (flathead catshark)
 Apristurus macrostomus Q. W. Meng, Y. T. Chu & S. Li, 1985 (broadmouth catshark)
 Apristurus manis S. Springer, 1979 (ghost catshark)
Apristurus manocheriani Cordova & Ebert 2021,  (Manocherian's Catshark)
 Apristurus melanoasper Iglésias, Nakaya & Stehmann, 2004 (black roughscale catshark)
 Apristurus microps Gilchrist, 1922 (smalleye catshark)
 Apristurus micropterygeus Q. W. Meng, Y. T. Chu & S. Li, 1986 (smalldorsal catshark)
 Apristurus nakayai Iglésias, 2013 (milk-eye catshark)  
 Apristurus nasutus F. de Buen, 1959 (largenose catshark)
 Apristurus parvipinnis S. Springer, 1979 & Heemstra, 1979 (smallfin catshark)
 Apristurus pinguis S. M. Deng, G. Q. Xiong & H. X. Zhan, 1983 (bulldog catshark)
 Apristurus platyrhynchus S. Tanaka (I), 1909 (spatulasnout catshark or Borneo catshark)
 Apristurus profundorum Goode & T. H. Bean, 1896 (deepwater catshark)
 Apristurus riveri Bigelow & Schroeder, 1944 (broadgill catshark)
 Apristurus saldanha Barnard, 1925 (Saldanha catshark)
†Apristurus sereti ADNET, 2006
 Apristurus sibogae M. C. W. Weber, 1913 (pale catshark)
 Apristurus sinensis Y. T. Chu & A. S. Hu, 1981 (South China catshark)
 Apristurus spongiceps C. H. Gilbert, 1905 (spongehead catshark)
 Apristurus stenseni S. Springer, 1979, 1979 (Panama ghost catshark)
 Apristurus sp. X Not yet described (Galbraith's catshark)
 Apristurus sp. 3 Not yet described (black wonder catshark)
 Apristurus sp. nov. Not yet described (white-edged catshark)
 Apristurus sp. Not yet described (gray ghost catshark)

References

 
Shark genera
Taxa named by Samuel Garman